Leopold Paul Little (22 February 1892 – 19 November 1956) was an Australian rules footballer who played with Melbourne and University in the Victorian Football League (VFL).

Family
The son of David Armstrong Little (1864-1926), and Annie Mary Little (1856-1944), née Hanigan, Leopold Paul Little was born at Bacchus Marsh on 22 February 1892.

He married Doris Speck (1899-1984) in 1920.

Education
He was attended St Patrick's College, Ballarat as a boarder from 1906 to 1910; and, in January 1910, it was announced that (as "Leopold Francis Paul Little", No.1812) he had passed the Junior Public Examination.

In January 1910 he sat for the Commonwealth Public Service Examination for Appointment as a Clerk, Class 5, and (as "Leopold Francis Paul Little") was 18th of all the 600 candidates.

Football

He played for University in 1912 and 1913. In 1914, as a member of the Commonwealth Public Service, he moved to Canberra.

On 17 October 1914,
"L.P. Little, late of Melbourne University, and of football fame, won the 120 yards hurdle, the high jump, and the 440 yards championship of the territory (open to all comers)".

He was not linked with the Melbourne Football Club until 1919 (on his return to Australia from active service)

Military service
He enlisted in the First AIF, as "Leo Paul Little", on 8 January 1916.

He played for the (winning) Third Australian national Divisional team in the famous "Pioneer Exhibition Game" of Australian Rules football, held in London, in October 1916. A news film was taken at the match.

He was wounded in action in 1917.

Death
He died on 19 November 1956 at the Mercy Hospital, in East Melbourne.

See also
 1916 Pioneer Exhibition Game

Footnotes

References
 Photograph at Leo Paul Little, ACT Memorial: detail of second from left, fourth row from top, at Postcard: "Our Queanbeyan Boys", No.3 (P01061.003), collection of the Australian War Memorial.
 Little, Leo P., "Trip to Kosciusko", The Bacchus Marsh Express, (Saturday, 19 December 1914), p.1.
 Pioneer Exhibition Game Australian Football: in aid of British and French Red Cross Societies: 3rd Australian Division v. Australian Training Units at Queen's Club, West Kensington, on Saturday, October 28th, 1916, at 3pm, Wightman & Co., (London), 1919.
 Holmesby, Russell & Main, Jim (2007). The Encyclopedia of AFL Footballers, 7th ed, Melbourne: Bas Publishing.
 Strong, Bill, "Leopold (Leo) Paul Little M.C. (1892-1956)", Wyndham History.
 First World War Embarkation Roll: Sergeant Leo Paul Little (315), collection of the Australian War Memorial.
 First World War Nominal Roll: Lieutenant Leo Paul Little (MC), collection of the Australian War Memorial.
 Honours and Awards (Military Cross): Lieutenant Leo Paul Little, collection of the Australian War Memorial; First World War Service Record: Lieutenant Leo Paul Little, National Archives of Australia.
 First World War Service Record: Lieutenant Leo Paul Little (MC), National Archives of Australia.
 Richardson, N. (2016), The Game of Their Lives, Pan Macmillan Australia: Sydney.

External links

 
 
 Demonwiki profile
 "Little, _Ports11" at The VFA Project.

Australian rules footballers from Victoria (Australia)
Players of Australian handball
People educated at St Patrick's College, Ballarat
University Football Club players
Melbourne Football Club players
Participants in "Pioneer Exhibition Game" (London, 28 October 1916)
Port Melbourne Football Club players
1892 births
1956 deaths
People from Bacchus Marsh
Military personnel from Victoria (Australia)